Miss Kitty is a ring name of professional wrestler Stacy Carter.

Miss Kitty may also refer to:

 Miss Kitty, a character portrayed by Amy Irving in the animated film An American Tail: Fievel Goes West
Miss Kitty Mouse, an entertainer portrayed by Melissa Manchester in The Great Mouse Detective
 Miss Kitty Russell, a character in the radio and television series Gunsmoke
 Miss Kitty, a sculpture by Paolo Schmidlin

See also
 Miss Kittin (born 1973), musical performer
 Kali Troy (born 1971), American voice actor known as "Miss Kittie"